Geometric abstraction is a form of abstract art based on the use of geometric forms sometimes, though not always, placed in non-illusionistic space and combined into non-objective (non-representational) compositions. Although the genre was popularized by avant-garde artists in the early twentieth century, similar motifs have been used in art since ancient times.

History
Geometric abstraction is present among many cultures throughout history both as decorative motifs and as art pieces themselves. Islamic art, in its prohibition of depicting religious figures, is a prime example of this geometric pattern-based art, which existed centuries before the movement in Europe and in many ways influenced this Western school. Aligned with and often used in the architecture of Islamic civilations spanning the 7th century-20th century, geometric patterns were used to visually connect spirituality with science and art, both of which were key to Islamic thought of the time.

Scholarly analysis

Throughout 20th-century art historical discourse, critics and artists working within the reductive or pure strains of abstraction have often suggested that geometric abstraction represents the height of a non-objective art practice, which necessarily stresses or calls attention to the root plasticity and two-dimensionality of painting as an artistic medium. Thus, it has been suggested that geometric abstraction might function as a solution to problems concerning the need for modernist painting to reject the illusionistic practices of the past while addressing the inherently two dimensional nature of the picture plane as well as the canvas functioning as its support. Wassily Kandinsky, one of the forerunners of pure non-objective painting, was among the first modern artists to explore this geometric approach in his abstract work. Other examples of pioneer abstractionists such as Kasimir Malevich and Piet Mondrian have also embraced this approach towards abstract painting. Mondrian's painting "Composition No. 10" (1939–1942) clearly defines his radical but classical approach to the construction of horizontal and vertical lines, as Mondrian wrote, "constructed with awareness, but not with calculation, led by high intuition, and brought to harmony and rhythm."

Just as there are both two-dimensional and three-dimensional geometries, the abstract sculpture of the 20th century was of course no less affected than painting by geometricizing tendencies. Georges Vantongerloo and Max Bill, for example, are perhaps best known for their geometric sculpture, although both of them were also painters; and indeed, the ideals of geometric abstraction find nearly perfect expression in their titling (e.g., Vantongerloo's "Construction in the Sphere") and pronouncements (e.g., Bill's statement that "I am of the opinion that it is possible to develop an art largely on the basis of mathematical thinking.") Expressionist abstract painting, as practiced by artists such as Jackson Pollock, Franz Kline, Clyfford Still, and Wols, represents the opposite of geometric abstraction.

Relationship with music

Abstract art has also historically been likened to music in its ability to convey emotional or expressive feelings and ideas without reliance upon or reference to recognizable objective forms already existent in reality. Wassily Kandinsky has discussed this connection between music and painting, as well as how the practice of classical composition had influenced his work, at length in his seminal essay Concerning the Spiritual in Art.

Selected artists

Artists who have worked extensively in geometric abstraction include:

 Nadir Afonso
 Josef Albers
 Richard Anuszkiewicz
 Mino Argento
 Hans Arp
 Rudolf Bauer
 Willi Baumeister
 Karl Benjamin
 Max Bill
 Ilya Bolotowsky
 Patrick Henry Bruce
 Kenneth Wayne Bushnell
 Norman Carlberg
 Ilya Chashnik
 Joseph Csaky
 Nassos Daphnis
 Ronald Davis
 Robert Delaunay
 Sonia Delaunay
 Tony DeLap
 Jean Dewasne
 Burgoyne Diller
 David Diao
 Ding Yi
 Theo van Doesburg
 Thomas Downing
 Lorser Feitelson
 María Freire
 Günter Fruhtrunk
 Albert Gleizes
 Frederick Hammersley
 Erwin Hauer
 Mary Henry
 Gottfried Honegger
 Bryce Hudson
 Al Held
 Auguste Herbin
 Carmen Herrera
 Hans Hofmann
 Budd Hopkins
 Wassily Kandinsky
 Ellsworth Kelly
 Hilma af Klint
 Ivan Kliun
 František Kupka
 Pat Lipsky
 El Lissitzky
 Michael Loew
 Peter Lowe
 Kazimir Malevich
 Agnes Martin
 Kenneth Martin
 John McLaughlin
 Peter Hugo McClure
 László Moholy-Nagy
 Vera Molnár
 Piet Mondrian
 François Morellet
 Aurélie Nemours
 Barnett Newman
 Marion Nicoll
 Kenneth Noland
 Alejandro Otero
 Rinaldo Paluzzi
 I. Rice Pereira
 Francis Picabia
 Ad Reinhardt
 Jack Reilly
 Bridget Riley
 Ivo Ringe
 Alexander Rodchenko
 Morgan Russell
 Sean Scully
 Victor Servranckx
 Leon Polk Smith
 Henryk Stażewski
 Jeffrey Steele
 Frank Stella
 Adam Szentpétery
 Sophie Taeuber-Arp
 Leo Valledor
 Georges Vantongerloo
 Victor Vasarely
 Friedrich Vordemberge-Gildewart
 Charmion von Wiegand
 Zanis Waldheims
 Gordon Walters
 Neil Williams
 Stanton Macdonald-Wright
 Larry Zox

See also

References

External links 

 Sculpture and Art websites at DMOZ
  of Geoform

Modern art
Abstract art
Contemporary art movements